The 1980–81 All-Ireland Senior Club Hurling Championship was the 11th season of the All-Ireland Senior Club Hurling Championship, the Gaelic Athletic Association's premier club hurling tournament. The All-Ireland series began on 12 April 1981 and ended on 17 May 1981.

Castlegar were the defending champions, however, they failed to qualify. Ballyhale Shamrocks won the title after defeating St. Finbarr's by 1-15 to 1-11 in the final.

Qualification

Results

Connacht Senior Club Hurling Championship

First round

Semi-final

Final

Leinster Senior Club Hurling Championship

First round

Quarter-finals

Semi-finals

Final

Munster Senior Club Hurling Championship

Quarter-final

Semi-finals

Final

Ulster Senior Club Hurling Championship

Semi-finals

Final

All-Ireland Senior Club Hurling Championship

Quarter-final

Semi-finals

Final

Championship statistics

Top scorers

Top scorers overall

Miscellaneous

 McQuillan's of Antrim become the first team to win three successive Ulster titles.
 Ballyhale Shamrocks win the All-Ireland title for the first time. In doing so they deny St. Finbarr's a unique double as their Gaelic footballers would later claim the All-Ireland title in that code.

References

1980 in hurling
1981 in hurling
All-Ireland Senior Club Hurling Championship